Gracia Cabrera Gómez (1 March 1936 – 2 June 2022), known professionally as Gracia Montes, was a Spanish copla singer.

Early life
Montes was born in Lora del Río, Seville, on 1 March 1936.

Career

1950s
Montes made her debut  in 1953 with the show "La copla por bandera" in Madrid. At the age of 17, she appeared at the Juvenile Galas held at the Cervantes Theater in Seville, joining the shows of various companies, including those of singers Pepe Pinto and La Niña de los Peines (Pastora Pavón) and in the variety shows of Mercedes Vecino and Los Gaditanos. Pastora, teacher of cante jondo, was the first artist that Montes listened to. For various reasons, some critics of the time likened her style to the cantaora.

In the mid-1950s, Montes made her first recording with the Columbia record label. That included the bulerías "La luna y el río" and "¿Será una rosa?", both written by Francisco de Val. She took part in radio programs in the fifties, such as Conozca usted a sus vecinos (Know your neighbors), by Rafael Santisteban, and Cabalgata fin de Semana, directed by Bobby Deglané. Montes performed her hit "¿Será una rosa?" as well as "Amor, ¿por qué no viniste, amor?" (Love, why didn't you come, love?) and "Camino del cielo" (Road to Heaven). The recording edited by Columbia of the latter differs from the original lyrics written by de Val.

Director Juan Antonio Bardem hires Montes for her intervention in the feature film, Death of a Cyclist (1955), in which she performs the fandango "Amor, why didn't you come, love?" (Fandangos de Huelva and Verdiales), but also includes some verses from the fandango "I would like to be a cowboy" by Pepe Pinto, recording live for the film a version different from the one collected on the original disc. Later, director José Luis Sáenz de Heredia calls her for his film Radio Stories (1955). The director asked Gracia Montes to interpret "Will it be a rose?" but the author of it asked the producer for an amount that he did not see fit. For this reason, Montes finally interprets some songs from Almonte that had also been received with great acceptance: "La Romera", written by a trio that had been interested in the voice of Gracia Montes: Ochaíta, Valerio and Solano. This trio of composers would also write for her the songs from Granada "Coplas del chapinero", "Una rosa colorá", "Speak with the eyes...!" or the sailor pasodoble "Cariá la Sanluqueña".

From the airwaves, Montes was discovered by talent scout José Brageli, who was a talent scout for figures from the show like Paquita Rico, Curro Romero or Mikaela. Launched under the stage name of Gracia Montes, she appeared before the Andalusian public with the show La Rosa de Andalucía, with a libretto by Ochaíta, Valerio and Solano. As exceptional spectators were in the crowded San Fernando Theatre Rafael Gómez "El Gallo", Juan Belmonte, La Malena or Pastora Pavón and her husband Pepe Pinto. Everyone agreed that Montes had a different voice. Then came the show Coplas al viento, with which she toured all of Spain. There, she shared the stage with reciter Gabriela Ortega, with creations by Ochaíta, Valerio and Solano.

1960s
Montes began a retirement from show business when success had come, staying nine years out of her professional career for sentimental reasons. The year 1965 marked a milestone in her personal and artistic life. After her love break, she returns with La rosa de las marismas, original by Ochaíta, Valerio and Solano, who conducted the orchestra, with great success at the San Fernando Theatre in Seville. Themes such as the hymns "Sevilla leads the compass", "The girl from Punta Umbría", "The light of your cigar", "Words in the wind", "Los tientos míos" or the sevillanas rocieras that gave name belong to this period. For Montes, the flamenco rumba "Don't give me war" and the popular zambra "I'm afraid" were devised by these same authors. But for unknown reasons, Gracia did not get to record them on disc, she did not even include them in the repertoire that was part of the show with which she returned in 1965. Both creations were recorded by Rocío Jurado. Montes belonged to the aforementioned show, a zambra entitled: "Another thing, partner"; her verses defoliated her own life. She also sang "You are a good man", a classic Andalusian theme, or fandangos from Huelva and verdiales of auction "It was a sin of love" or the masterful rumba "Without thinking about it".

In 1966, Montes recorded two 45 rpm records, both written by Ochaíta and maestro Solano. In one of them, she included themes like "That day ..!" and "Your arms have held me." The other disc collected four saetas dedicated to brotherhoods and sisterhoods of Seville, with a flamenco quejío and a touch just right for this palo. In 1967, she re-recorded the song that made her a star: "¿Será una rosa?" This time she changed the orchestration for a guitar, clapping and jaleos. This same album includes another of her most important hits: "Viajera...!, written by Francisco de Val. A year later, Gracia Montes recorded another of her best-known songs, "Maruja Limón", a Flamenco rumba written by Quintero, León and Quiroga. It also included some bulerías dedicated to her home town of Lora del Río, which were titled "De Lora, ¡y olé!", by the same authors.

Following the most classic line of Andalusian song, in 1968, Montes recorded an album written by Rafael de León and maestro Quiroga. She performs "I'm afraid of the moon", an Andalusian romance that had previously been recorded by Concha Piquer, Estrellita Castro and Miguel de Molina. Next, she records another album with four flamenco rumbas. One of them achieved great acceptance: "Moscatel", dedicated to Chipiona, a town in Cádiz where she spent the summer. Around this time, when she was still living between Madrid and Barcelona, Montes made a program for TVE called Luces en la noche. In it, she interpreted hits harvested by the artist: "Maruja Limón", "La lumbre de tu cigarro", "Moscatel".

Discography
 1966: ¡Ese día! 
 1967: ¿Será una rosa?
 1976: Lo mejor de Sevilla
 2002: A ti, madre

References

External Links
 
 

1936 births
2022 deaths
People from Vega del Guadalquivir
20th-century Spanish women singers
20th-century Spanish singers
21st-century Spanish women singers
21st-century Spanish singers